This is a list of flags of provinces of Spain. The flags are listed per autonomous community. The list also discusses coat of arms as most flags feature them.

Andalusia

Aragon

Asturias

Balearic Islands

Basque Country

Canary Islands

Cantabria

Castile and León

Castilla-La Mancha

Catalonia

Extremadura

Galicia

La Rioja

Community of Madrid

Region of Murcia

Navarre

Valencian Community

Historical

References

See also 
 List of Spanish flags

Provinces
.Flags
Flags
Spain
Spain